Mount Dennis is a  mountain summit located three kilometres south of Field in Yoho National Park, in the Park Ranges of British Columbia, Canada. The nearest higher neighbor is Mount Stephen,  to the northeast, and Mount Burgess is six kilometres north on the opposite side of the Kicking Horse River valley. Precipitation runoff from Mount Dennis drains into tributaries of the Kicking Horse River which in turn is a tributary of the Columbia River.


History

The first ascent of the mountain was made in 1887 by James J. McArthur of the Dominion Land Survey.

The mountain was named in 1916 by Alexander MacKinnon Burgess for Lieutenant-Colonel John Stoughton Dennis (1820–1885), a Canadian surveyor who proposed the Dominion Land Survey system in 1869.

The mountain's toponym was officially adopted in 1924 by the Geographical Names Board of Canada.

Geology
Mount Dennis is composed of sedimentary rock laid down during the Precambrian to Jurassic periods. Formed in shallow seas, this sedimentary rock was pushed east and over the top of younger rock during the Laramide orogeny.

Climate
Based on the Köppen climate classification, Mount Dennis is located in a subarctic climate zone with cold, snowy winters, and mild summers. Winter temperatures can drop below −20 °C with wind chill factors below −30 °C. Weather conditions during winter make Mount Dennis one of the premier places in the Rockies for ice climbing.

Ice climbing routes
Ice climbing routes with grades on Mount Dennis
 Carlsberg Column - WI5
 Guinness Gully - WI4
 Pilsner Pillar - WI6
 Cascade Kronenbourg - WI6
 Last Call - WI3

See also
Geography of British Columbia

References

External links
 Weather forecast: Mount Dennis
 Parks Canada web site: Yoho National Park
 Dictionary of Canadian Biography: John Stoughton Dennis

Two-thousanders of British Columbia
Canadian Rockies
Mountains of Yoho National Park
Kootenay Land District